Bob Crawford (January 21, 1899 – May 18, 1970) was an American athlete. He competed in the men's individual cross country event at the 1920 Summer Olympics.

References

External links
 

1899 births
1970 deaths
Athletes (track and field) at the 1920 Summer Olympics
American male long-distance runners
Olympic track and field athletes of the United States
Sportspeople from Belfast
Irish emigrants to the United States (before 1923)
Olympic cross country runners